Probably may refer to:

 Probability, the chance that something is likely to happen or be the case
 "Probably" (South Park), an episode of the TV series South Park
 "Probably" (song), a song by Fool's Garden
 A word that is used in the Google Assistant's Crystal Ball game.

See also
 Probably the best lager in the world, the tagline of Carlsberg Group
 Probability (disambiguation)
 Problem (disambiguation)
 Pro (disambiguation)